

Events
Frankie Yale takes leadership of the Unione Siciliane after founder Ignazio "the Wolf" Lupo is convicted of numerous charges ranging from extortion to murder.
Tong leader Mock Duck, upon his release from Sing Sing prison, retires from crime.
June 6 – Ciro Terranova is charged with ordering the deaths of Charles Lombardi, Joe DiMarco, and Michael Hayes, however the case is later dropped.

Births
Michael James Genovese, Pittsburgh crime family Boss and possible cousin of Vito Genovese
January 31 – Philip Rastelli "Rusty", Bonanno crime family Don

References 

Organized crime
Years in organized crime